Mullet is an Australian film released in 2001, written and directed by David Caesar, and starring Ben Mendelsohn, Susie Porter and Andrew Gilbert.

Plot summary
In the film, Eddie (Ben Mendelsohn) returns to his home town on the south coast of New South Wales.  Having left for the city without explanation 3 years ago, he tries to pick up the pieces of his life and fit back into the lives of those he left, including his ex-girlfriend Tully (Susie Porter) and brother Pete (Andrew Gilbert).  The title of the film comes from Eddie's nickname and from his attempts to make a living poaching mullet.

The film succeeds in a very human portrayal of the difficulties in living on the fringe of a close-knit community.  The drama of the developing relationships is supported by very dry comedy (archetypical Australian humour) and detailed but understated design.

Cast

Production
The film was based on a short story written by writer-director David Caesar. The film was shot in its entirety in the town of Gerringong over four weeks in June 2000. Originally, Sheehan had intended to shoot interiors in Sydney, but found the cost of doing so was prohibitive within the film's budget. Production benefitted from the involvement of the local residents and the community, including the Kiama Knights rugby league club and cameo performances by Mick Cronin and Steve Starling, both well known Australian television personalities. While shooting was undertaken on a tight schedule, in it was eight years from first concept to completion.

Awards and nominations
AFI Awards, 2001
Nominated: Best Actor
Nominated: Best Supporting Actor
Nominated: Best Supporting Actress
Nominated: Best Director
Nominated: Best Original Screenplay

Australian Screen Sound Guild, 2001
Won: Best Achievement in Sound for a Feature Film – Dialogue & ADR Editing

Australian Writers' Guild, 2001
Won: Awgie Award – Feature Film – Original

Film Critics Circle of Australia Awards, 2001
Won: Best Screenplay – Original
Won: Best Supporting Actor – Male
Nominated: Best Actor – Male
Nominated: Best Director
Nominated: Best Film
Nominated: Best Supporting Actor – Female

Shanghai International Film Festival, 2001
Won: Best Director

Box office
Mullet grossed $1,165,606 at the box office in Australia.

See also
Cinema of Australia

References

External links
 Review by John Flaus: An Impressionist Work: Mullet, senses of cinema, 2001. Retrieved January 2008
 Official website
Mullet at the National Film and Sound Archive
 
Mullet at Oz Movies

2001 films
Australian comedy films
2001 comedy films
Films directed by David Caesar
Films set in New South Wales
Films shot in New South Wales
2000s English-language films